Annular pustular psoriasis is a rare variant of pustular psoriasis, having an annular, or circinate, lesion morphology that may appear at the onset of pustular psoriasis, with a tendency to spread and form enlarged rings.

See also
 Psoriasis
 List of cutaneous conditions

References

External links 

Psoriasis